Tokary may refer to the following places in Poland:
Tokary, Lower Silesian Voivodeship (south-west Poland)
Tokary, Lublin Voivodeship (east Poland)
Tokary, Podlaskie Voivodeship (north-east Poland)
Tokary, Masovian Voivodeship (east-central Poland)
Tokary, Greater Poland Voivodeship (west-central Poland)
Tokary, Opole Voivodeship (south-west Poland)
Tokary, Pomeranian Voivodeship (north Poland)
Tokary, West Pomeranian Voivodeship (north-west Poland)